was the 89th emperor of Japan, according to the traditional order of succession. This reign spanned the years 1246 through 1260.

This 13th-century sovereign was named after the 9th-century Emperor Ninmyō and go- (後), translates literally as "later", and thus he could be called the "Later Emperor Fukakusa". The Japanese word go has also been translated to mean the "second one"; and in some older sources, this emperor may be identified as "Fukakusa, the second", or as "Fukakusa II".

Name

Although the Roman-alphabet spelling of the name of this 13th-century emperor is the same as that of the personal name of a current member of the Imperial family, the kanji are different:
 Emperor Go-Fukakusa, formerly Prince Hisahito (久仁)
 Prince Hisahito of Akishino (悠仁)

He was the second son of Emperor Go-Saga.

Issue
Empress: Saionji (Fujiwara) Kimiko (西園寺（藤原）公子) later Higashinijō‘in (東二条院), Saionji Saneuji's daughter
Second daughter: Imperial Princess Takako (貴子内親王; 1262–1273)
 Daughter (1265-1266）
Third daughter: Imperial Princess Reishi (姈子内親王; 1270–1307）later Yūgimon'in (遊義門院), married Emperor Go-Uda
Consort: Tōin (Fujiwara) Inshi (洞院（藤原）愔子) later Genkimon-in (玄輝門院; 1246–1329), Tōin Saneo's daughter
Fourth daughter: Imperial Princess Hisako (久子内親王; 1272–1346) later Eiyōmon'in (永陽門院)
Second son: Imperial Prince Hirohito (熈仁親王) later Emperor Fushimi
Third son: Imperial Prince Mitsuhito（満仁親王) later Imperial Prince Priest Shonnin (性仁法親王; 1267–1304）
Court Lady: Saionji (Fujiwara) Aiko (西園寺（藤原）相子), Saionji Kinsuke's daughter
Fifth daughter: Imperial Princess Hanako/Eiko/Akiko (瑛子内親王; 1288–1352）later Yōtokumon'in (陽徳門院)
Court Lady: Saionji (Fujiwara) Moriko (西園寺（藤原）成子), Saionji Kintsune's daughter
 First Son: Imperial Prince Tsunehito (常仁親王; d. 1264)
 Fourth Son: Imperial Prince Yukihito (幸仁親王; 1269–1272）
Court Lady: Sanjō (Fujiwara) Fusako (三条（藤原）房子), Sanjō Kinchika's daughter
Fifth son: Imperial Prince Priest Gyōkaku (行覚法親王; 1274–1293）
Seventh son: Imperial Prince Hisaaki (久明親王)
Ninth son: Imperial Prince Priest Sokaku (増覚法親王) 
 Sixth Daughter: Imperial Princess Eiko (永子内親王) later Shozenmon’in (章善門院; d. 1338）
Court Lady: Miyoshi Tadako (三善忠子; d. 1299), Miyoshi Yasuhira's daughter
Sixth Son: Imperial Prince Priest Shinsho (深性法親王; 1275–1299）
Court Lady: Bettō-Naishi (別当典侍), Takakura Shigemichi's daughter
 Eighth Son: Imperial Prince Priest Kojo (恒助法親王; 1288–1310）
Court Lady: Lady Nijō, Minamoto no Masatada's daughter
 Prince (1273–1274)
unknown
 Prince (1263–1266)

Political significance
When Go-Fukakusa ascended to the throne in 1246 at the age of four, his father Go-Saga continued to rule from his position of Retired Emperor. In 1260 Go-Saga forced Go-Fukakusa to abdicate in favor of Kaneyama.  Kaneyama's son was named Crown Prince (later known as Emperor GoUda). Go-Fukakusa appealed to the shogunal administration in the city of Kamakura and had his own son (later known as Emperor Fushimi) named next in line after Go-Uda. During the reign of Go-Uda, Go-Fukakusa exerted power from the office of Retired Emperor. An agreement was reached by which the next emperors would alternate between descendants of Go-Fukakusa and descendants of Kameyama.

Events of Go-Fukakusa's life
 formally became  at the age of 2; and Go-Saga began to exercise power as cloistered Emperor.

 16 February 1246 (Kangen 4, 29th day of the 1st month): In the 4th year of Go-Saga-tennōs reign (後嵯峨天皇四年), he abdicated; and the succession (senso) was received by his 4-year-old son.  Shortly thereafter, Emperor Go-Fukakusa is said to have acceded to the throne (sokui).

In 1259, at the insistence of Retired Emperor Go-Saga, he abdicated at the age of 15 to his younger brother, who would become Emperor Kameyama.

After Emperor Go-Uda's ascension in 1260, Saionji Sanekane negotiated with the Bakufu, and succeeded in getting Emperor Go-Fukakusa's son Hirohito named as Crown Prince.  In 1287, with his ascension as Emperor Fushimi, Go-Fukakusa's cloistered rule began.

In 1290, he entered the priesthood, retiring from the position of cloistered Emperor.  But, with his seventh son, Imperial Prince Hisaaki becoming the 8th Kamakura shōgun among other things, the position of his Jimyōin-tō became strengthened.

In 1304, he died. He is enshrined with other emperors at the imperial tomb called Fukakusa no kita no misasagi (深草北陵) in Fushimi-ku, Kyoto.

Kugyō
 is a collective term for the very few most powerful men attached to the court of the Emperor of Japan in pre-Meiji eras. Even during those years in which the court's actual influence outside the palace walls was minimal, the hierarchic organization persisted.

In general, this elite group included only three to four men at a time.  These were hereditary courtiers whose experience and background would have brought them to the pinnacle of a life's career.  During Go-Fukakusa's reign, this apex of the Daijō-kan included:
 Sesshō, Ichijō Sanetsune, 1246–1247
 Sesshō, Konoe Kanetsune, 1247–1252
 Sesshō, Takatsukasa Kanehira, 1252–1254
 Kampaku, Takatsukasa Kanehira, 1254–1261
 Sadaijin
 Udaijin
 Nadaijin
 Dainagon

Eras of Go-Fukakusa's reign
The years of Go-Fukakusa's reign are more specifically identified by more than one era name or nengō.
 Kangen             (1243–1247)
 Hōji          (1247–1249)
 Kenchō      (1249–1257)
 Kōgen  (1256–1257)
 Shōka        (1257–1259)
 Shōgen      (1259–1260)

See also
 Emperor of Japan
 List of Emperors of Japan
 Imperial cult
 Prince Hisahito of Akishino

Notes

References

 Ponsonby-Fane, Richard Arthur Brabazon. (1959).  The Imperial House of Japan. Kyoto: Ponsonby Memorial Society. OCLC 194887
 Titsingh, Isaac, ed. (1834). [Siyun-sai Rin-siyo/Hayashi Gahō, 1652], Nipon o daï itsi ran; ou, Annales des empereurs du Japon.]  Paris: Oriental Translation Fund of Great Britain and Ireland.
 Varley, H. Paul , ed. (1980). (Kitabatake Chikafusa, 1359), Jinnō Shōtōki  ([https://books.google.com/books?id=tVv6OAAACAAJ&dq=A+Chronicle+of+Gods+and+Sovereigns:+Jinn%C5%8D+Sh%C5%8Dt%C5%8Dki+of+Kitabatake+Chikafusa&lr= A Chronicle of Gods and Sovereigns: Jinnō Shōtōki. New York: Columbia University Press.

External links 
 Link to Kyoto National Museum – calligraphy of Emperor Go-Fukakusa

 
 

Japanese emperors
1243 births
1304 deaths
Emperor Go-Fukakusa
Emperor Go-Fukakusa
Emperor Go-Fukakusa
Emperor Go-Fukakusa
13th-century Japanese monarchs
14th-century Japanese people
People from Kyoto